was a combined appeal with Douglas v Hello! Ltd and Mainstream Properties Ltd v Young and stands as the leading case on economic torts in English law.

Facts

Lord Hoffmann in his judgment summarised the facts.

Judgment

Elaborating on the general principle that an agent cannot be sued for interfering with contractual relationships between a principal and another contracting party, Lord Hoffmann held that invalidly appointed receivers were not liable to the company for wrongful interference with contractual relations. Such a receiver acting in good faith employs no unlawful means and intends to cause no loss. Intangible property cannot be the subject of a claim for conversion.

On the tort of inducing or procuring breach of contract, there are five requirements. (1) there must be a contract (2) the contract must be breached (3) the defendant's conduct must have procured or induced the breach (4) the defendant must have known about the breached term or turned a blind eye to it, and (5) the defendant must have actually realised that the conduct procuring the breach would have that result.

See also
Economic torts in English law
Conversion (law)
Torquay Hotel Co Ltd v Cousins [1969] 2 Ch 106

Notes

References

External links
House of Lords judgments page

English tort case law
English privacy case law
United Kingdom tort case law
2007 in case law
2007 in British law
House of Lords cases